Years link to corresponding "[year] in poetry" articles.

Arabic world

Works
 The Book of One Thousand and One Nights is compiled in Baghdad

Poets

Births of Arabic world poets
 742 – Ibrahim Al-Mausili (died 804)
 c. 805 – Abu Tammam (died 845)
 820 – al-Buhturi (died 897)
 861 – Abdullah ibn al-Mu'tazz (died 908)
 897 – Abu al-Faraj al-Isfahani (died 967)

Deaths of Arabic world poets
 809 – Abbas Ibn al-Ahnaf (born 750) (عباس بن الأحنف)
 813 – Abu Nuwas (born 750)
 828: 
 Abu-l-'Atahiya
 Abu-l-'Atahiya (born 748)
 837 – Ibn Duraid
 845 – Abu Tammam (born c. 805)
 896 – Ibn al-Rumi
 897 – al-Buhturi (born 820)

Turkic world
 Possible early date for the oral development of the Book of Dede Korkut

Persia

Persian poets
 Rudaki (رودکی)
 Mansur Al-Hallaj (منصور حلاج)
 Shahid Balkhi
 Firuz Mashreqi
 Hanzala Badghisi
 Basam Kurd
 Wasif Sagzi

Germanic and Celtic Europe

Poets
 Likely period when Cynewulf flourishes in Mercia or Northumbria
 Bragi Boddason flourishes in the Swedish court in the first half of the century, author of  Bragi inn gamli Boddason (Norwegian)
 Þjóðólfur úr Hvini (Norwegian)
 Þorbjörn hornklofi (Norwegian)
 Reign of King Alfred the Great, a noted poet in Anglo-Saxon, in Wessex from 871 to 899

Works
 9th century:
 Expansion of Gregorian chant, particularly in the Frankish lands of Europe
 Cynewulf, The Fates of the Apostles, Juliana, Elene, and Christ II in Old English
 Llywarch Hen in Welsh
 Sequence of Saint Eulalia, earliest surviving poem in Old French
 The Phoenix in Old English
 Approximate period of Waldere in Old English
 c. 800
 Pangur Bán in Old Irish
 830s:
 Lay of Hildebrand in Old High German
 880s or 890s:
 Ludwigslied and Georgslied in Old High German
 890s:
 Abbo Cernuus, De bellis Parisiacae urbis (The Wars of the City of Paris), in Latin

Byzantine Empire and Slavic Europe

Events
 c. 855: Saints Cyril and Methodius develop the Glagolitic alphabet;Cyrillic is developed about the same time in Bulgaria.  These alphabets permit translation of the Bible into Old Church Slavonic and other Slavic languages.  First development of Slavic literary languages.
 Preslav Literary School (est. c. 885) and Ohrid Literary School (est. 886) flourish in Bulgaria.

Poets
 Constantine of Preslav in Bulgaria authors Азбучна молитва (Alphabet Prayer), the earliest surviving poetry in Old Church Slavonic.

East Asia

 The Han-shan poet and Feng-Kan, both part of the Tientai Trio, flourish in China.

China

 Pi Rixiu (834–883), Tang Dynasty poet and magistrate

Japan
 Ariwara no Narihira 在原業平 (825–880), waka poet and nobleman; called one of the Six best Waka poets and one of the Thirty-six Poetry Immortals
Fujiwara no Kanesuke 藤原兼輔, also 中納言兼輔 (877–933), middle Heian waka poet and nobleman; one of the Thirty-six Poetry Immortals; has a poem is in the anthology Hyakunin Isshu, others in several imperial poetry anthologies, including Kokin Wakashū and Gosen Wakashū
Fujiwara no Sadakata 藤原定方, also known as "Sanjo Udaijin" 三条右大臣 (873–932), father of poet Asatada, cousin and father-in-law of Kanesuke; has a poem in Hyakunin Isshu anthology
Ki no Tomonori 紀友則 (c. 850 – c. 904), early Heian period waka poet of the court, one of the Thirty-six Poetry Immortals; one of the four compilers of the Kokin Wakashū anthology
Ki no Tsurayuki 紀貫之 (872–945)  Heian period waka poet, government official and courtier; son of Ki no Mochiyuki; one of four compilers of the Kokin Wakashū anthology; provincial governor of Tosa province (930–935) and later possibly governor of Suo province
Kisen 喜撰 also known as "Kisen Hōshi" 喜撰法師 (fl. early 9th century), early Heian period Buddhist monk and poet
Kūkai 空海, also known posthumously as "Kōbō-Daishi" 弘法大師 (774–835), monk, scholar, poet, and artist who founded the Shingon or "True Word" school of Buddhism, followers of that school usually refer to him by the honorific title "Odaishisama" お大師様
Lady Ise 伊勢 or Ise no miyasudokoro 伊勢の御息所 (c. 875 – c. 938), waka poet and noblewoman in the Imperial court; granddaughter of waka poet Ōnakatomi no Yoshinobu; born the Fujiwara no Tsugikage of Ise; lover of the Prince Atsuyoshi; a concubine to Emperor Uda; her son by him was Prince Yuki-Akari; has many poems in the Kokin Wakashū anthology
Minamoto no Kintada 源公忠, also 源公忠朝臣 (889–948), middle Heian period waka poet and nobleman; one of the Thirty-six Poetry Immortals, along with his son Minamoto no Saneakira; an official in the imperial treasury; has poems in imperial poetry anthologies, starting with the Goshūi Wakashū
Ōnakatomi no Yorimoto 大中臣頼基 (c. 886–958), middle Heian period waka poet and nobleman; one of the Thirty-six Poetry Immortals
Ono no Komachi 小野 小町 or おののこまち (c. 825 – c. 900), early Heian period waka poet, one of the Rokkasen — the Six best Waka poets; one of the Thirty-six Poetry Immortals; noted as a rare beauty and became a symbol of a beautiful woman in Japan
Ōshikōchi Mitsune 凡河内躬恒 (898–922), early Heian period administrator and waka poet of the court; one of the Thirty-six Poetry Immortals
 Sakanoue no Korenori 坂上是則 (fl. 9th century), early Heian waka poet; one of the Thirty-six Poetry Immortals; has a poem in the Hyakunin Isshu anthology
 Sarumaru no Taifu (fl. 9th century) 猿丸大夫, also known as "Sarumaru no Dayū", early Heian period waka poet; one of the Thirty Six Poetic Sages; no detailed histories or legends about him exist, and he may never have existed; some  believe he was Prince Yamashiro no Ōe
 Semimaru 蝉丸, also known as "Semimaro" (fl. 9th century), early Heian period poet and musician ; some accounts say he was a son of Uda Tennō, Prince Atsumi, or that he was the fourth son of Daigo Tennō; some claim he lived during the reign of Ninmyō Tennō
 The Six best Waka poets in Japan
 Sugawara no Michizane 菅原道真, also known as "Kan Shōjō" 菅丞相, (845–903), Heian Period scholar, poet and politician; grandson of Sugawara no Kiyotomo; also wrote Chinese poetry
 The Tales of Ise

South Asia

Works
 Approximate date of the text of the Bhagavata Purana
 Asaga's Vardhaman Charitra (Life of Vardhaman), written in 853 CE, the first Sanskrit biography of Jain Tirthankara, Mahavir.

Poets
 Rajasekhara, in Sanskrit
 Asaga, in Sanskrit and Kannada

Decades and years

 01
09
Poetry